Ryan’s Son (1968-1987) was a successful showjumping horse ridden by John Whitaker. He was sired by a Thoroughbred called Ozymandias and born from an Irish Draught mare. In January 2007, Ryan’s Son joined John Whitaker in being inducted into The British Horse Society Equestrian Hall of Fame.

In 2020 he was named as one of the greatest horses of all time by Country Life (magazine) with Ryan’s Son being noted for “a distinctive white blaze, a swishing tail and a habit of bucking violently after the last fence that was beloved by the public.” A crowd favourite, Ryan’s Son became renowned for bucking after the final fence. On the bucking, jockey John Whittaker was quoted as saying: 
 “He was showing off. He knew he had finished by the applause and by feeling me switch off the pressure. He said: ‘that’s it, I have done it’, and bucked. It was off-putting, though, if the audience clapped after a difficult combination in the middle of a round, because he bucked then too, which would put you wrong for the next fence.”

Career
Malcolm Barr gave Ryan’s Son to a teenage (and future son in law) John Whittaker in 1973 after buying him for £2,500. He would end up earning more than a hundred times that, winning Olympic, World and European Championship medals, the British Jumping Derby at the All England Jumping Course at Hickstead and the King George V Gold Cup amongst others. Whittaker would comment that the horse catapulted him into success and without him Whittaker would have become a milkman. He also said “Ryan’s Son got me to the top and changed our lives” The horse and teenage John bonded immediately, becoming the team to beat at local shows around Huddersfield. This was despite the fact John had, at first sight, considered Ryan’s Son to look like cart horse with big feet, big head, too much white on him, a ewe neck and too small standing barely 16hh. Whittaker and Ryan’s son won at The Great Yorkshire Show when Whitaker was still 17 and defeated more experienced riders such as David Broome and Harvey Smith in doing so. Ryan’s Son would go on to become the biggest money-winner on the circuit for 10 years and Ryan’s Son became first British show jumping horse to win more than £200,000. After winning silver in the 1980 European Championship, in 1982 Ryan’s Son ridden by John Whittaker was part of the team that won silver at the World Show Jumping Championships prior to the competition becoming part of the combined WEG. He would go on to medal at the 1984 Olympics, and the 1983 World Championships. He won the Hickstead British Jumping Derby in 1983 and the King George V Cup Gold Cup aged 17. He was a winner at the Royal International Horse Show, Horse of the Year Show and at London Olympia Ryan’s Son became a household name thanks to his endeavour.

Death
In 1987 Ryan’s Son died following an in-competition fall during the Hickstead Derby. It had not seemed a bad fall initially, and horse and rider walked out of the ring but three hours later, in a private stable of the master of Hickstead, Douglas Bunn, and with the vet in attendance, Ryan’s Son collapsed suddenly and died, probably from an internal haemorrhage. John and his wife Clare, were there, so too was his mother Enid and father Donald.

References

Show jumping horses
Individual warmbloods
Individual male horses
1968 animal births
1987 animal deaths